Doe v Bennett, 2004 SCC 17 is a legal ruling by the Supreme Court of Canada which upheld the lower court's decision that the ecclesiastical corporation, Roman Catholic Episcopal Corporation of St. George's in Western Newfoundland,  was vicariously liable (as well as directly liable) for sexual abuse by Father Kevin Bennett.

The Court concluded that the ecclesiastical corporation's secondary responsibility originates from the power and authority over parishioners that the Church gave to its priests. The facts satisfied the close connection test: "the evidence overwhelmingly satisfies the tests affirmed in  Bazley, Jacobi and KLB  The relationship between the diocesan enterprise and Bennett was sufficiently close." It asserted that:

The Court declined to address the "difficult question of whether the Roman Catholic Church can be held liable in a case such as this."

References

External links
 

Canadian tort case law
Catholic Church sexual abuse scandals in Canada
2004 in Canadian case law
2004 in religion
Supreme Court of Canada cases
Child sexual abuse in Canada